Jamie Bhatti (born 8 September 1993) is a Scotland international rugby union player who currently plays as a loose head prop for Glasgow Warriors. He previously played for Edinburgh Rugby and Bath Rugby; and had at prior stint at Glasgow Warriors.

Background

Bhatti was born in Stirling on 8 September 1993. His surname is of Indian origin; his paternal grandfather emigrated to Scotland from Ludhiana in the 1960s. As a teenager he worked in an abattoir and as a nightclub door steward and applied unsuccessfully to become a police officer before turning professional in rugby.

Rugby union career

Amateur career

Bhatti started his youth rugby with Hillfoot Minis before moving on to Stirling County where he came through the age grades of midi and colts before playing for the senior side. He then moved to play for Melrose. He has played for the Caledonia district at Under 17, Under 18 and Under 19 age grades. When not playing for Glasgow Warriors, Bhatti plays for Melrose RFC.

Bhatti has been drafted to Ayr in the Scottish Premiership for the 2018-19 season.

Professional career

Bhatti was awarded a place in the Scottish Rugby Academy for season 2016-17. He was a Stage 3 player for Glasgow and the West regional academy.

Bhatti made his debut for Glasgow Warriors on 30 August 2016. He played at Bridgehaugh Park for the Warriors against Canada 'A'.

Bhatti was selected for Scotland's 2018-19 Summer Tour to Canada, America and Argentina.

In December 2020, Bhatti signed for Premiership Rugby side Bath as injury cover until the end of the season.

On 22 January 2021, Bhatti will return to Glasgow Warriors in the Pro14 for a second stint from the 2021-22 season.

International career

Bhatti has represented Scotland at Under 17, Under 18 and Under 19 age grades. He was later capped for Scotland Club XV. Bhatti received his first call up to the senior Scotland squad by coach Gregor Townsend in October 2017 for the Autumn Internationals, appearing as a replacement in all three tests including a historic win over Australia.

He was capped by Scotland 'A' on 25 June 2022 in their match against Chile.

References

External links
 
profile at Scottish Rugby
profile at Edinburgh Rugby

1993 births
Living people
Ayr RFC players
Bath Rugby players
Edinburgh Rugby players
Glasgow Warriors players
Hillfoots RFC players
Melrose RFC players
Rugby union players from Stirling
Rugby union props
Scotland Club XV international rugby union players
Scotland international rugby union players
Scottish people of Indian descent
Scottish rugby union players
Stirling County RFC players
Scotland 'A' international rugby union players